Ninera is the unique Slovak version of the hurdy-gurdy. One well-known ninera player in Slovakia is Tibor Koblicek, born in a small village of Turicky, near Cinobaňa in southern Slovakia.

References

External links
 Pictures of a ninera at the ULUV Craftmen's Days
 Sound of a ninera

Hurdy-gurdies
Slovak musical instruments